The 2012–13 North Carolina A&T Aggies men's basketball team represented North Carolina Agricultural and Technical State University during the 2012–13 NCAA Division I men's basketball season. The Aggies, led by first year head coach Cy Alexander, played their home games at the Corbett Sports Center and are members of the Mid-Eastern Athletic Conference. They finished the season 20–17, 8–8 in MEAC play to finish in a tie for sixth place. They were champions of the MEAC tournament, winning the championship game over Morgan State, to earn an automatic bid to the 2013 NCAA tournament where they defeated Liberty in the first round, for their first ever NCAA Tournament win, before losing in the second round to Louisville.

Roster

Schedule

|-
!colspan=9| Exhibition

|-
!colspan=9| Regular season

|-
!colspan=9| 2013 MEAC men's basketball tournament

|-
!colspan=9|2013 NCAA tournament

References

North Carolina A&T Aggies men's basketball seasons
North Carolina
North Carolina AandT
North Carolina AandT Aggies men's basketball
North Carolina AandT Aggies men's basketball